In enzymology, a fluoren-9-ol dehydrogenase is an enzyme that catalyzes the chemical reaction

fluoren-9-ol + 2 NAD(P)+  fluoren-9-one + 2 NAD(P)H + 2 H+

The 3 substrates of this enzyme are fluoren-9-ol, NAD+, and NADP+, whereas its 4 products are fluoren-9-one, NADH, NADPH, and H+.

This enzyme belongs to the family of oxidoreductases, specifically those acting on the CH-OH group of donor with NAD+ or NADP+ as acceptor. The systematic name of this enzyme class is fluoren-9-ol:NAD(P)+ oxidoreductase. This enzyme participates in fluorene degradation.

References

 
 

EC 1.1.1
NADPH-dependent enzymes
NADH-dependent enzymes
Enzymes of unknown structure